Dame Elizabeth Ann Slade, DBE (born 12 May 1949), is a retired judge of the High Court of England and Wales.

She was educated at Wycombe Abbey and Lady Margaret Hall, Oxford.

She was called to the bar at Inner Temple in 1972 and became a bencher in 1990. She was made a QC in 1992, recorder from 1998 to 2008, deputy judge of the High Court from 1998 to 2008, and judge of the High Court of Justice (Queen's Bench Division) from 2008 until her retirement in May 2019.

References

1949 births
Living people
People educated at Wycombe Abbey
Alumni of Lady Margaret Hall, Oxford
Members of the Inner Temple
Queen's Bench Division judges
Dames Commander of the Order of the British Empire